Hans Mezger (18 November 1929 – 10 June 2020) was a German automotive engineer well known for his work at Porsche.

Career
Mezger was born in Besigheim, in Württemberg, Germany. He graduated from the Stuttgart Technical University in 1956 with a Diploma of Engineering degree, and went straight to work at Porsche's Works 1 development department. His first project was to work on the valve train of the Fuhrmann-designed Carrera engine. In 1959 he moved to the design department to work on the type 753 flat-eight engine for the Porsche 804 Formula 1 car.

Over the next 35 years he took part in the 1960s F1 programme, undertook design leadership for the first Porsche 911 production engine and leader of the famed 1960s Race Design office that turned out the 917s. Mezger led Porsche's development of turbocharging with the 1100 hp 917/30 and its application to the 911 Turbo.

Mezger was responsible for the Porsche-made TAG Turbo engine from the mid 1980s, which won multiple championships in Formula One in the McLaren MP4/2 chassis.

He retired in 1994.

Mezger died on June 10th, 2020 at the age of 90.

References

Porsche and Me: Hans Mezger, Autobiography with Peter Morgan. 2011. 978-1906712082

1929 births
2020 deaths
People from Besigheim
People from the Free People's State of Württemberg
German automotive engineers
Porsche people
Engineers from Baden-Württemberg